Robert George Fryday (December 5, 1928 – January 12, 2007) was a Canadian professional ice hockey forward who played five games in the National Hockey League for the Montreal Canadiens. He was born in Toronto, Ontario. He scored one goal during his career.

Career
Fryday played for the Montreal Junior Canadiens in 1947, scoring the game-winner in a preliminary round Memorial Cup play-off match against Halifax. He was named an all-star that year at the right wing position.

Fryday was called up on trial from the Montréal Royals for the Canadiens in 1950, tallying a goal in a 3-3 tie against Boston.

Fryday would also play for the Montréal Royals and Cincinnati Mohawks in 1952. In 1953, Fryday would play for the Buffalo Bisons, sustaining an injury in a January game against Pittsburgh and then being assigned to Victoria. However, Fryday did not report to the Victoria team for the 1953-54 season.

References

External links

Obituary at LostHockey.com

1928 births
2007 deaths
Buffalo Bisons (AHL) players
Canadian ice hockey forwards
Cincinnati Mohawks (AHL) players
Ice hockey people from Toronto
Montreal Canadiens players
Canadian expatriate ice hockey players in the United States